Baluran is a stratovolcano located on the island of Java. It is at the very northeast of the island and is overshadowed by its much larger neighbour Ijen. The mountain has not erupted in historical times, although it is considered to be of Holocene age.

See also
 Baluran National Park
 List of volcanoes in Indonesia

References

External links

Mountains of East Java
Stratovolcanoes of Indonesia
Subduction volcanoes
Volcanoes of East Java
Situbondo Regency